Pizzo Cramalina is a mountain of the Swiss Lepontine Alps, overlooking Vergeletto in the canton of Ticino. It lies on the chain between the valleys of Vergeletto and Maggia.

References

External links
 Pizzo Cramalina on Hikr

Mountains of the Alps
Mountains of Switzerland
Mountains of Ticino
Lepontine Alps